Kyle Martin may refer to:

 Kyle Martin (first baseman) (born 1992), American baseball first baseman
 Kyle Martin (footballer) (born 1990), Australian rules football player
 Kyle Martin (musician), American musician
 Kyle Martin (pitcher) (born 1991), American baseball pitcher